A full-text database or a complete-text database is a database that contains the complete text of books, dissertations, journals, magazines, newspapers or other kinds of textual documents. They differ from bibliographic databases (which contain only bibliographical metadata, including abstracts in some cases) and non-bibliographic databases (such as directories and numeric databases).

One of the earliest systems was IBM STAIRS, introduced in 1973.

Full-text databases became common about 1990 when computer storage technology made them economic and technologically possible. There are two main classes: an extension of the classical bibliographical databases into full-text databases (e.g. on hosts such as BRS, Dialog, LexisNexis and Westlaw) and Internet-based full-text databases (based on search engines or XML).

See also
 Digital library
 Full-text search

References

Tenopir, Carol & Ro, Jung Soon (1990). Full Text Databases. New York: Greenwood Press.